Tůně u Hajské is natural monument close to the town Strakonice in Strakonice District, Czech Republic. The area is protected due to large amount of small pools in Otava River floodplain which were formed as a result of gold mining in the Middle Ages. These ponds are containing habitat of critically endangered aquatic plant Hottonia palustris and many representatives of amphibian species as Bufo bufo, Bufo viridis, Bombina bombina, Hyla arborea, Pelophylax esculentus and Rana ridibunda.

Nature reserves in the Czech Republic
Protected areas in the Strakonice District